Justin Ehrke (born 26 March 1972) is a South African cricketer. He played in one List A and ten first-class matches for Border from 1993/94 to 1995/96.

See also
 List of Border representative cricketers

References

External links
 

1972 births
Living people
South African cricketers
Border cricketers
Cricketers from Johannesburg